Markiyan Shashkevych (November 6, 1811 in Pidlyssia, Kingdom of Galicia and Lodomeria – June 7, 1843 in Novosilky, Kingdom of Galicia and Lodomeria) was a priest of the Ukrainian Greek Catholic Church, a poet, a translator, and the leader of the literary revival in Right-bank Ukraine.

Shashkevych's parents were Simon Shaskevych (Szaszkiewicz) and Elizabeth Audykowska, who was the daughter of Rev. Romanus Audykowski, the Greek Catholic parish priest in Pidlyssia. In 1832, Shashkevych and fellow students organized a group aimed at the rise of the Ukrainian dialect free of Church Slavonic and alien 'styles' up to the literary language.
He graduated from the Greek Catholic Theological Seminary at University of Lviv in 1838 and worked as a priest in the rural Lwow powiat. During his studies he met Yakiv Holovatsky and Ivan Vahylevych, with whom he formed the Ruthenian Triad (aka Ruska Triytsia).

The activities of the Shashkevych circle constituted not only a literary phenomenon, but a social and democratic movement. Its greatest achievement was the publication of an almanac entitled Rusalka Dnistrova ('The Mermaid of the Dniester'), which was the first collection of Ukrainian literature to appear in Western Ukraine (1837).

After a short life, he was first buried at Nowosilky in 1843, present Zolochiv Raion of the Lviv Oblast, Ukraine, and then in 1891 his mortal remains were transferred to the Lychakiv Cemetery.

See also
Ukrainian literature

References

1811 births
1843 deaths
People from Lviv Oblast
People from the Kingdom of Galicia and Lodomeria
Ukrainian Austro-Hungarians
Ukrainian poets
University of Lviv alumni
Ukrainian Eastern Catholics
Burials at Lychakiv Cemetery
19th-century poets
Eastern Catholic poets
Members of the Ukrainian Greek Catholic Church
Ukrainian writers in Polish